Kunowo  is a settlement in the administrative district of Gmina Słupca, within Słupca County, Greater Poland Voivodeship, in west-central Poland.

The settlement has a population of 8.

References

Villages in Słupca County